Pabellón Universitario de Navarra is an arena in Pamplona, Spain.  It is primarily used for team handball and is the home arena of MRA Navarra FS and Basket Navarra Club. The arena holds 3,000 people.

External links
The pavilion at the UPNA website

Handball venues in Spain
Indoor arenas in Spain
Sports venues in Navarre
2000 establishments in Spain
Sports venues completed in 2000